Dezmon Patmon (born August 6, 1998) is an American football wide receiver for the Buffalo Bills of the National Football League (NFL). He played college football at Washington State.

College career
A 3-star recruit, Patmon committed to play college football at Washington State over offers from Boise State, California, and UNLV. He was a two-year starter at Washington State.  As a junior, he led the team with 816 receiving yards and his 61 receptions and 816 receiving yards were eighth in the Pac-12 Conference. In his senior season, he made 58 receptions for 762 yards and eight touchdowns. In his career, Patmon caught 156 passes for 1,976 yards and 13 touchdowns.

Professional career

Indianapolis Colts
Patmon was selected by the Indianapolis Colts in the sixth round (212th overall) in the 2020 NFL Draft.

On September 2, 2021, Patmon was placed on injured reserve to start the season. He was activated on November 4. Patmon scored his first touchdown on December 25, 2021, in the week 15 matchup against the Arizona Cardinals, that put the Colts up 22-13.

On October 4, 2022, Patmon was waived by the Colts. He was re-signed to the Colts' practice squad the following day.

Buffalo Bills
On January 17, 2023, Patmon was signed to the Buffalo Bills practice squad. He signed a reserve/future contract on January 23, 2023.

NFL Career Statistics

Personal life
Patmon was named after former Michigan Wolverines wide receiver Desmond Howard. His uncle DeWayne Patmon played linebacker at Michigan followed by the New York Giants in 2000–01.

References

1998 births
Living people
Players of American football from San Diego
American football wide receivers
Washington State Cougars football players
Indianapolis Colts players
Buffalo Bills players